Sklinna Lighthouse is a lighthouse in the municipality of Leka in Trøndelag county, Norway. The lighthouse is one of the northernmost points in Trøndelag county.

See also

Lighthouses in Norway
List of lighthouses in Norway

References

External links
 Norsk Fyrhistorisk Forening 
 Picture of Sklinna Lighthouse

Lighthouses completed in 1910
Lighthouses in Trøndelag
Leka, Norway